The Women of Gnadenstein is a 1921 German silent drama film directed by Robert Dinesen and Joe May and starring Erich Kaiser-Titz, Margarete Schön and Grete Diercks. The film was produced in 1920, but was not passed for censorship and screening until early 1921.

The film's sets were designed by the art director Otto Hunte.

Cast
Grete Diercks as Rose Marie Schlegel
Olga Engl
Leopold Gadiel
Harry Hardt
Erich Kaiser-Titz as Baron Werner von Dierckhoff
Adolf Klein as Pfarrer
[[Hedwig Lehmann
Paul Passarge
Hans Adalbert Schlettow as Fred Hagen
Margarete Schön as Ruth
Hedy Searle

References

Bibliography
Nelmes, Jill & Selbo, Jule. Women Screenwriters: An International Guide. Palgrave Macmillan, 2015. .

External links

Films of the Weimar Republic
German silent feature films
Films directed by Joe May
Films directed by Robert Dinesen
German black-and-white films
1921 drama films
German drama films
UFA GmbH films
Silent drama films
1920s German films